Sean McKirdy (born 12 April 1998) is a Scottish footballer who last played as a midfielder for Lowland League club Kelty Hearts.

Career
McKirdy began his career as a youth player at Hutchison Vale. After signing professional terms with Hearts he made his debut on 20 August 2014, in the second round of the Scottish Challenge Cup away to Livingston, replacing Angus Beith in the 85th minute of a 4–1 loss. On 18 April 2015, with Hearts already crowned champions, he made his Scottish Championship debut at Tynecastle, replacing Kenny Anderson in the 57th minute of a 2–1 win over Raith Rovers. On 22 August, he made his Scottish Premiership debut, replacing Prince Buaben for the final 16 minutes of a 3–0 home win over Partick Thistle. Towards the end of the 2015–16 season, Hearts head coach Robbie Neilson said that the club would not renew McKirdy's contract.

On 11 August 2016, McKirdy signed for Hamilton Academical on a one-year contract. He was loaned to Berwick Rangers in February 2017. He was released by Hamilton at the end of the 2016–17 season.

On 22 March 2019, McKirdy signed for Kelty Hearts from Lowland League rivals Gala Fairydean Rovers.

Personal life
McKirdy was born in Edinburgh, where he attended Broughton High School. At the school he was part of the Scottish FA Football Performance School.

McKirdy is a personal trainer and fitness coach.

Career statistics

Honours
Kelty Hearts
Lowland League: 2019–20

References

1998 births
Living people
Footballers from Edinburgh
People educated at Broughton High School, Edinburgh
Scottish footballers
Association football defenders
Heart of Midlothian F.C. players
Hamilton Academical F.C. players
Scottish Professional Football League players
Scotland youth international footballers
Berwick Rangers F.C. players
Selkirk F.C. players
Gala Fairydean Rovers F.C. players
Kelty Hearts F.C. players
Lowland Football League players